Daugavpils Theatre is a theatre in Daugavpils, Latvia.

Daugavpils Theatre was founded in 1857 and is one of the oldest professional theatres in Latvia, as well as the only permanent professional theatre in the Latgale region. It stages plays in the Latvian, Russian and Latgalian languages.

See also

References

External links
 

Theatres in Latvia
1857 establishments in the Russian Empire
Daugavpils